A cold snap, also known as a cold wave, is a period of intensely cold and dry weather

Cold snap may also refer to:
Coldsnap, an expansion set for the trading card game Magic: The Gathering from the Ice Age block
Coldsnap, a member of DC Comics Masters of Disaster supervillain team
Cold Snap (Albert Collins album), 1986
Cold Snap (Weeping Tile album), 1996
"Cold Snap" (Heroes), an episode from the fourth season of the TV series Heroes
”Cold Snap” (Dexter: New Blood), is the premiere episode of the sequel TV series Dexter: New Blood